List of Italian records in masters athletics are the current records in the various age groups of masters athletics for Italy competitors. Starting at age 35, each age group starts on the athlete's birthday in years that are evenly divisible by 5 and extends until the next such occurrence. For record purposes, older athletes are not included in younger age groups, except in the case of relay team members. A relay team's age group is determined by the age of the youngest member. There are two categories of relay records, one for composite teams made up of four American runners usually National teams at major championships, and a Club record for members of the same club, from the same Association. These are the offiacl reports of the Italian Athletics Federation.

Some masters events (hurdles, throwing implements) have modified specifications. The combined events use an age-graded result applied against the standard scoring table. Based on IAAF rule 260.18a, since 2000, indoor marks superior to the outdoor record are eligible for record purposes. They are noted with an "i"

In Italy the age of an athlete is based on the year of birth.
One performance that is obtained before the initial day of age group is recognized as Italian record, but not enter in WMA ranking.

Men
Legend

"pre" is a record performance obtained before the actual age censorship, as provided by the international federation W.M.A.

100 metres

200 metres

400 metres

800 metres

1500 metres

3000 metres

5000 metres

10,000 metres

10K run

Half marathon

Marathon

100K run

24H run

3000 m steeplechase

2000 m steeplechase

110/100/80 m hs

400 m hs

300 m hs

200 m hs

High jump

Pole vault

Long jump

Triple jump

Shot put

Discus throw

Hammer throw

Javelin throw

Weight throw

Pentathlon

Decathlon

Pentathlon throws

Race walk 3000 m

Race walk 5000 m

Race walk 10,000 m

Race walk 10 km

Race walk 20 km

Race walk 30 km

Race walk 50 km

Women
Legend

"pre" is a record performance obtained before the actual age censorship, as provided by the international federation W.M.A.

100 m F

200 m F

400 m F

800 m F

1500 m F

3000 m F

5000 m F

10,000 m F

10K run F

Half marathon F

Marathon F

50K run F

100K run F

24H run F

2000 m steeplechase F

3000 m steeplechase F

Short hurdles F

200 m hs F

Long hurdles F

High jump F

Pole vault F

Long jump F

Triple jump F

Shot put F

Discus throw F

Hammer throw F

Javelin throw F

Weight Throw F

Pentathlon throw F

Eptathlon

Pentathlon

Pentathlon F

Race walk 3000 m F

Race walk 5000 m F

Race walk 10,000 m F

Race walk Km 10 road

Race walk Km 20 road F

80 m

150 m

300 m

500 m

600 m

1000 m

Mile

2000 m

See also
 List of world records in masters athletics
 List of European records in masters athletics
 List of Italian records in athletics

References
General
Italian Masters Outdoor records Men  3 March 2023 updated
Italian Masters Outdoor records Women 3 March 2023 updated
Specific

External links
 L'atletica da Master at FIDAL 

Italian
Italy masters
Records masters
masters athletics